Game crash may refer to:

 video game crash of 1977, a glut in the market caused by manufacturers clearing older stock.
 video game crash of 1983
 Crash (computing)